N,α-Diethylphenethylamine (N,α-DEPEA, 2-ethylamino-1-phenylbutane, EAPB) is a close chemical analog of methamphetamine, which has been sold as a designer drug. It was originally patented by Knoll Pharma as one of several analogs for pharmaceutical applications. In animals models these analogs showed properties of cognitive enhancement and increased pain tolerance. Nevertheless, this class of compounds was never developed into a medicine.
 has not been studied in humans, but experts such as Pieter Cohen of Harvard Medical School expect it to be less potent than methamphetamine, but greater than ephedrine.

Adulterant in nutritional supplements
In January 2013, the Korean authorities reported seizing a large quantity of the pure material, predicting it would soon be found on the market.  Later in 2013, it was found as an adulterant in biologically significant amounts in the pre-workout supplements Craze (marketed by Driven Sports, Inc.) and  Detonate (marketed by Gaspari Nutrition). It was falsely claimed to be Dendrobium extract.

See also 
 Buphedrone
 Butylone
 EBDB
 Etilamfetamine
 Eutylone
 N-Ethylbuphedrone
 Phenylisobutylamine

References 

Designer drugs
Norepinephrine-dopamine releasing agents
Phenethylamines
Substituted amphetamines